Teldenia specca is a moth in the family Drepanidae. It was described by Wilkinson in 1967. It is found in the north-eastern Himalayas and from western China to Borneo, Sumatra, Palawan, Buru and New Guinea.

References

Moths described in 1967
Drepaninae